Black Castle may refer to:

Buildings and structures
 Black Castle, East Lothian, a Scottish Iron Age hillfort
 Black Castle of Moulin, a Scottish castle ruin
 Black Castle, Lough Gur, an Irish castle ruin
 Black Castle, Templemore, an Irish castle ruin
 Black Castle, Thurles, an Irish castle ruin
 Black Castle, Wicklow, an Irish castle ruin
 Leighlinbridge Castle, or Black Castle, Leighlinbridge, an Irish castle ruin
 Black Castle, Bristol, an English pub
Castle of St John the Baptist, also known as Castillo Negro (Black Castle), Santa Cruz de Tenerife

Other uses
 Black Castle, a 2006 album by Royal Fam
 The Black Castle, a 1952 American horror film 
The Black Castle (radio program), an American 1940s radio series
Massey Energy, formerly Black Castle Mining Co.

See also
Blackcastle Rings, Scotland